The Catholic News Agency (CNA) is a news service owned by Eternal Word Television Network (EWTN) that provides news related to the Catholic Church to the global anglophone audience. Founded in 2004 as the English section of the worldwide ACI Group, which publishes the Spanish-language news service , it is headquartered in Denver, Colorado, United States. It was acquired by EWTN in 2014. 

As of January 2023, CNA's executive director is Jeanette De Melo, the longtime editor-in-chief of the National Catholic Register, which is also owned by EWTN. De Melo currently serves as executive director of both the Register and CNA.

In 2011, CNA said its editors' would provide free news, features, commentary, and photojournalism to editors of newspapers.

CNA was led by editor-in-chief J.D. Flynn from Aug. 1, 2017 until Dec. 31, 2020, when he departed with Washington bureau chief Ed Condon to form Pillar Catholic.

See also
 Catholic World News

References

External links
 

2004 establishments in the United States
News agencies based in the United States
Conservative media in the United States